Crenidens indicus is a species of ray-finned fish from the sea bream family Sparidae.

It is found in the Western Indian Ocean from the southern Arabian Peninsula, sometimes found in the Red Sea, up through the Persian Gulf, to the coasts of Iran and Pakistan.

References

Psomadakis, P.N., H.B. Osmany and M. Moazzam, 2015. Field identification guide to the living marine resources of Pakistan. FAO Species Identification Guide for Fishery Purposes, 386p.

Sparidae
Taxa named by Francis Day
Fish described in 1873
Fish of the Red Sea
Fish of the Indian Ocean